Töömoyun is a mountain in the western part of the Osh Region of Kyrgyzstan. It is near the village Kara-Koktu, between Nookat and Aravan. There are several karst caves on the slopes of the mountain, including Ajydaar-Üngkür, the Baryte Cave and the Fersman Cave.

References

Osh Region
Mountains of Kyrgyzstan